Sévigny is a commune in the Orne department in north-western France.

See also
 Communes of the Orne department
 Haras du Petit Tellier, one of the oldest thoroughbred horse breeding farms in France

References

Communes of Orne